The Chadefaudiellaceae are a family of fungi in the Sordariomycetes class, subclass Hypocreomycetidae.

References

Microascales
Ascomycota families